Lanter may refer to:

 Lanter (card game), another name for the English card game, Lanterloo
 Matt Lanter (b 1983), US actor and model

See also 
 Lenter